H. Martin "Marty" Haag, Jr. (1934–2004) was the news director at the perennially dominant ABC station, WFAA-TV, in Dallas, Texas from 1973 to 1989. During those 16 years, WFAA won five DuPont-Columbia Awards, more than any other local television news station during that time, and a George Foster Peabody Award in 1988.

Education
Haag earned his bachelor's degree from the University of Missouri in Columbia, Missouri after attending Texas Christian University for one year. His college roommate at TCU was Jim Lehrer. He earned a Master's degree in Journalism from Columbia University.

Career
Haag began his journalism career in print as an education reporter and editor for The Dallas Morning News during the late 1950s. He then moved to radio as news director at WBAP in Dallas before finding his true niche in television. Haag served first as national assignment editor and overnight manager at NBC News, then worked as an assistant news director at CBS News in New York City before joining a then ratings-impaired WFAA in 1973, becoming their executive news director.

Over the next decades, Marty Haag and WFAA reached national prominence, most notably from their coverage of the Delta Air Lines Flight 191 crash at Dallas-Fort Worth Airport in 1985. CNN carried WFAA's live feed for the entire day.

Under Haag's guidance at WFAA, many of the station's reporters went on to join the major news networks.  They include Scott Pelley, Paula Zahn, Verne Lundquist, Bill Macatee, Andrea Joyce, Peter Van Sant, Russ Mitchell, Leeza Gibbons, and Bill O'Reilly.

In 1989, Haag moved to WFAA's parent company, Belo, to become the Senior Vice-President of Broadcast News Operations and to oversee the company's stations across the country; thus handing over the executive news director duties to John Miller, who was previously assistant news director. He retired in 2000.

That year, Haag received the broadcast industry's highest honor, the George Foster Peabody Award for lifetime achievement. The organization described Haag as "an industry icon, who's helped establish high ethical standards and quality reporting at both local and network news levels." Former Nightline anchor Ted Koppel said in a letter to the Peabody committee that WFAA operates at a network level because "it reflects Marty Haag's sense of professionalism, his high standards and his impeccable value system."

Retirement
After retirement, Haag worked as a consultant and taught several journalism courses at Southern Methodist University.

Haag died of a stroke on January 10, 2004.

Criticism
Barbara Cochran of  the Radio-Television News Directors Association called Haag, "... one of the best and brightest the television news business has ever known".

References

External links
 Belo mourns passing of a television industry legend, former executive H. Martin Haag, Jr.
 A Tribute to Marty Haag
 Former Broadcast Division Executive receives Peabody Award
 Marty Haag on NewsHour with Jim Lehrer: Central Casting
 Marty Haag on NewsHour with Jim Lehrer: WBBM-TV

American television journalists
Peabody Award winners
1934 births
2004 deaths
University of Missouri alumni
Texas Christian University alumni
Columbia University Graduate School of Journalism alumni
The Dallas Morning News people
American male journalists